The Chinese Taipei men's national 3x3 team is a national basketball team of Chinese Taipei, administered by the Chinese Taipei Basketball Association. It represents the country in international 3x3 (3 against 3) basketball competitions.

Tournament records

World Cup record

Asian Games

See also
Chinese Taipei national basketball team
Chinese Taipei women's national 3x3 team

References

External links

3x3
Men's national 3x3 basketball teams